Clevudine (INN) is an antiviral drug for the treatment of hepatitis B (HBV). It is already approved for HBV in South Korea and the Philippines. It is marketed by Bukwang Pharmaceuticals in South Korea under the tradenames Levovir and Revovir.

Researchers in South Korea are testing clevudine at lower doses in combination with adefovir for continued use.

It is a nucleoside analog.

References

Nucleoside analog reverse transcriptase inhibitors
Pyrimidinediones
Organofluorides
Arabinosides
Halohydrins
Hydroxymethyl compounds